Branz is a surname. Notable people with the surname include:

 María Sol Branz (born 1990), Argentine sailor
 Hermann Branz (1920–2004), German philatelist

See also
 Kranz (surname)